Rod Wood is an American businessman and football executive. He is currently the president for the Detroit Lions of the National Football League (NFL).

Professional career
Previous to being hired as the president of the Detroit Lions, Wood was a close associate of the Ford family that owns the team, and worked as the President and CEO of the Ford Estates.

Detroit Lions
Wood was signed with the Detroit Lions as a Team President on Nov 19, 2015. Wood attended University of Michigan-Flint and the ABA Graduate School of Commercial Banking. On accepting the appointment, Wood stated that he was "not qualified to run any other NFL team", a statement that led some critics of his hiring to label him as unqualified for the job of running the Lions. Wood has refused to give up the Detroit Lions's traditional Thanksgiving game despite pressure from other NFL teams.

Stadium Upgrade
In February 2017, Wood unveiled plans for the first major renovation to the Detroit Lions’ home stadium, Ford Field, since it opened in 2002. The $100 million investment incorporated a complete overhaul of the audio and visual experience that features new videoboards as well as a new state-of-the-art sound system. The stadium’s premium spaces also received a complete makeover with expanded offerings to fans. Wood has also discussed adding a retractable roof to the field to attract MLS teams to play there.

References

External links
Profile
New Job
Twitter
Stadium Renovations

Living people
1950s births
American sports executives and administrators
Detroit Lions executives
National Football League team presidents
American chief executives
University of Michigan alumni